"Let Me Love You Tonight" is a 1980 song by the American pop and country rock band Pure Prairie League.  The lead vocalist for the band at the time was Vince Gill, who would later become a successful country music singer in his own right. Noted saxophonist David Sanborn can also be heard on the track.

Charts
Taken as the first single from their 1980 album, Firin' Up, "Let Me Love You Tonight" became the band's first (and, to date, only) song to enter the top 10 on the Billboard Hot 100 chart, where it peaked at number 10 during the summer of 1980, and remained in the Top 40 for 11 weeks. The song also spent three weeks at number one on the Billboard adult contemporary chart.

Chart history

See also
List of number-one adult contemporary singles of 1980 (U.S.)

References

External links
Single release information at discogs.com

1980 singles
Pure Prairie League songs
Casablanca Records singles
Pop ballads
1980 songs
1980s ballads